Kościuszki may refer to the following places:
Kościuszki, Łódź Voivodeship (central Poland)
Kościuszki, Gmina Nowogard in West Pomeranian Voivodeship (north-west Poland)
Kościuszki, Gmina Osina in West Pomeranian Voivodeship (north-west Poland)